John Behan (born 1938) is an Irish sculptor from Dublin. He studied at the National College of Art and Design in Dublin, and Ealing Art College, London, and Oslo's Royal Academy School. He is a member of Aosdána.

He helped establish the Project Arts Centre, Dublin in 1967 and the Dublin Art Foundry. Notable sculptures include Arrival, commissioned by the Irish Government and presented to the United Nations in 2000 and Wings of the World in Shenzhen, China, 1991. In the mid 1990s Behan was commissioned by the Irish Government to create a National Famine Memorial that would encompass the magnitude of the suffering and loss endured by the people of Ireland during this period. The memorial located in Murrisk, County Mayo was unveiled by Mary Robinson on 20 July 1997.

The Liberty Tree sculpture in Carlow, designed by John Behan, commemorates the 1798 Rising of the United Irishmen. Several hundred rebels were slain in Carlow town and their remains are buried in the 'Croppies Grave', in Graiguecullen, County Carlow.

See also
 List of public art in Cork
 List of public art in Galway city

References

Further reading 
 

1938 births
Living people
Irish sculptors
Aosdána members
20th-century Irish sculptors
Male sculptors
20th-century Irish male artists
21st-century Irish sculptors
21st-century Irish male artists
Alumni of the National College of Art and Design